Barrengarry Nature Reserve is a protected area of 21 hectares, situated in Barrengarry in the Illawarra region of New South Wales. The nearest town is Kangaroo Valley. The reserve endeavours to protect rainforest communities and eucalyptus forest. As well as populations of threatened species such as the eastern bristlebird, brush-tailed rock-wallaby and long-nosed potoroo.

See also
 Protected areas of New South Wales

References 

Nature reserves in New South Wales
Forests of New South Wales
2001 establishments in Australia
Southern Highlands (New South Wales)